Assistens Cemetery (Danish: Assistens Kirkegård) in Copenhagen, Denmark, is the burial site of many Danish notables as well as an important greenspace in the Nørrebro district. Inaugurated in 1760, it was originally a burial site for the poor laid out to relieve the crowded graveyards inside the walled city, but during the Golden Age in the first half of the 19th century it became fashionable and many leading figures of the epoch, such as Hans Christian Andersen, Søren Kierkegaard, Christoffer Wilhelm Eckersberg, and Christen Købke are all buried here.

Late in the 19th century, as Assistens Cemetery had itself become crowded, a number of new cemeteries were established around Copenhagen, including Vestre Cemetery, but through the 20th century, it continued to attract notable people. Among the latter are the Nobel Prize-winning physicist Niels Bohr and a number of American jazz musicians who settled in Copenhagen during the 1950s and 1960s, including Ben Webster and Kenny Drew.

An assistenskirkegård (meaning "assistance cemetery") is originally a generic term in Danish, used to refer to cemeteries which were laid out to assist existing burial sites, usually those located in urban settings in connection with churches, and therefore a number of cemeteries by the same name are found around Denmark.

The cemetery is one of five run by Copenhagen Municipality; the other cemeteries are Vestre Cemetery, Brønshøj Cemetery, Sundby Cemetery, and Bispebjerg Cemetery.

History

Background

In Medieval times intramural interment was the rule although outdoor graveyards gradually became more common. In 1666 the Naval Holmen Cemetery was moved from its original location at Holmen Church to a site outside the Eastern City Gate as the first burial facility to be located outside the city.

An outbreak of plague in 1711 which killed an estimated 23,000 citizens put the existing burial sites under so much pressure that up to five coffins were sometimes buried on top of each other. This led to the establishment of five new cemeteries on the periphery of the city, but just inside the city walls, while the military Garrison Cemetery was relocated to a site next to that of Holmen Cemetery.

Establishment of the new cemetery
In the 1750s the situation deteriorated even further and in a letter of 2 May 1757 the City Council proposed to the Chancellery that a large new cemetery be built for the city's parishes outside the city walls. After some negotiations it was decided to place it outside the Northern City Gate and on 26 May 1757 the new facility was founded by Royal charter. The new cemetery was inaugurated on 6 November 1760. It was enclosed by a wall built by Philip de Lange.

Originally the cemetery was intended as a burial ground for paupers. In 1785 an affluent citizen, astronomic writer and First Secretary of the War Chancellery Johan Samuel Augustin, made specific requests to be interred at the cemetery, in his codicil stating that "Mein Begräbnis soll auf dem Armen-Kirchhofe vor dem Norderthor seyn, wesfalls ich sehon mit Mr. Simon, der dort Gräber ist, gesprochen habe". He was soon followed by other leading figures from the elite and the cemetery soon developed into the most fashionable burial ground of the city.

A popular excursion spot

Around that time, excursions to the cemetery with picnic baskets and tea became a popular activity among common citizens of Copenhagen. In his account of a visit to Copenhagen in 1827, the Swedish poet Karl August Nicander fondly remembers Assistens Cemetery:

The excursions sometimes evolved into rowdy gatherings and legislation was passed to prevent this. A commission established in 1805 issued instructions which prohibited the consumption of food or drink as well as music or any other kind of cheerful behaviour in the cemetery. The gravediggers, who lived on the premises, were to enforce these restrictions but they seem to have taken their duties lightly. Legislation from 1813 prohibited them to sell alcohol to visitors to the cemetery. Despite all these efforts, the desired peace and quiet was a long time in coming. For particularly grand funerals, crowds of spectators would gather, and people would festoon the cemetery walls to get a better view. To reduce numbers of visitors, there was talk of introducing admission fees, but this was never carried out.

Assistens Cemetery today

The cemetery is still serving its original purpose as a burial ground but is also a popular tourist attraction, as well as the largest and most important green space in the inner part of the Nørrebro district.

It is divided into sections. The oldest part is Section A and features the graves of Søren Kierkegaard and the painter Christen Købke among others. Section D is dedicated to religious minorities, containing Roman Catholic and Reformed graves as well as Russian graves. Section E is the section which originally served under Church of Our Lady.

Herman Stilling Museum
In 2003 an old horse stable in a corner of Assistens Cemetery was converted into a small museum dedicated to writer and artist Herman Stilling, a native to the Nørrebro area and mainly known for painting trolls. Apart from the permanent exhibition, the museum also contains an exhibition space for special exhibitions, a picture workshop for children and young people, and a café.

Notable interments

 Kjeld Abell
 Nicolai Abildgaard
 Peter Christian Abildgaard
 Daniel Adzer
 Svend Aggerholm
 Christian Aigens
 Peter Adler Alberti
 Sophie Alberti
 Hans Christian Andersen (buried at the Collin family grave, but the stone was moved to another graveyard in 1914, Frederiksberg Ældre Kirkegård)
 Carl Christoffer Georg Andræ
 Christian Arntzen
 Johan Samuel Augustin
 Oluf Lundt Bang
 Peter Georg Bang
 Christian Bastholm
 Christian Bauditz
 Hans Heinrich Baumgarten
 Christian Frederik Beck
 Andreas Peter Berggreen
 Dorte-Maria Bjarnov
 Claes Birch
 H. W. Bissen
 Louis Bobé
 Allan Bock
 Andreas Bodenhoff
 Giertrud Birgitte Bodenhoff
 Christian Bohr
 Harald Bohr 
 Niels Bohr
 Robert Bojesen
 Richard Bently Boone
 Bonaparte Borgen
 Vilhelm August Borgen
 André Bork
 Frederik Christian Bornemann
 Mathias Hastrup Bornemann
 Johan Henrich Brandemann
 Hans Brøchner
 Emil Bähncke
 Wilhelm Bähncke
 Ludvig Bødtcher
 P. C. Bønecke
 Etta Cameron
 Karen Caspersen
 Peter Atke Castberg
 John Christensen
 Villads Christensen
 Ernst Christiansen
 Andreas Clemmensen
 Mogens Clemmensen
 Christoph Cloëtta
 Christian Colbiørnsen
 Johan Christian Severin Danielsen
 Ferdinand Didrichsen
 Karen Dissing
 Frederik Drejer
 Kenny Drew
 Otto Steen Due
 William Frederik Duntzfelt
 C.W. Eckersberg
 Erling Eckersberg
 Jens Eckersberg
 Jakob Ejersbo
 Peter Elfelt
 Sigurd Elkjær
 Johannes Erwig
 Otto Evens
 Peter Faber (Danish telegraph specialist)
 Peter Didrik Weinreich Fischer
 Johan Georg Forchhammer
 Hermann Ernst Freund
 Astrid Friis
 Johannes Frederik Frølich
 G. E. C. Gad
 Ludvig Gade
 Vincenzo Galeotti
 Peter Gemzøe
 Jens Giødwad
 Emanuel Gregers
 Ken Gudman
 Søren Gyldendal
 Hugo Gyldmark
 Inger-Lise Gaarde
 P. C. Hagemann
 Andreas Hallander
 Søren Hallar
 Poul Hanmann
 Christian Hansen
 Dagmar Hansen
 Frantz Johannes Hansen
 Niels Jacob Hansen
 Rudolph Hansen
 Rasmus Harboe
 C. F. Harsdorff
 Otto Haslund
 Sven Hauptmann
 Mathilde Malling Hauschultz
 Anker Heegaard
 Henry Heerup
 Betty Hennings
 Henrik Hennings
 Christian Severin Henrichsen
 Christian Ludvig August Herforth
 Johan Daniel Herholdt
 Henrik Hertz
 Christian Frederik Hetsch
 Georg Hilker
 N. P. Hillebrandt
 Tage Hind
 Theodor Hirth
 Angelo Hjort
 Frants Christian Hjorth
 Søren Hjorth
 Holger-Madsen
 Georg Holgreen
 Kenny Holst
 Niels Henrik Holst
 Ferdinand Hoppe
 C. F. E. Horneman
 Emil Horneman
 Christian Hornemann
 Emil Hornemann
 Jens Wilken Hornemann
 Frantz Gotthard Howitz
 Georg Howitz
 Chresten Hørdum
 Valdemar Ingemann
 R.P. Ipsen
 Christen Jacobsen
 Palle Jacobsen
 Birger Jensen
 Frederik Jensen
 Valdemar Jensen
 Christian Magdalus Jespersen
 Christian Magdalus Jespersen
 Ejner Johansson
 J.F. Johnstrup
 Henri Alexandre Antoine de Dompierre de Jonquières
 Jean André Frédéric de Dompierre de Jonquières
 Jens Juel
 Finn Juhl
 Pia Juul
 Karen Jønsson
 Ellen Jørgensen
 Henriette Jørgensen
 Eugen Jørgensen
 Elisabeth Karlinsky
 Asmus Kaufmann
 Søren Kierkegaard
 August Klein
 Charlotte Klein
 Vilhelm Klein
 P. Knudsen
 Jørgen Hansen Koch
 Thomas Koppel
 Lars Andreas Kornerup
 Bamse Kragh-Jacobsen
 Johan Krohn
 Niels Brock Krossing
 Hans Ernst Krøyer
 Henrik Nikolai Krøyer
 Friedrich Kuhlau
 Christen Købke
 Julius Lange
 Florian Larsen
 Johannes Ephraim Larsen
 Jørgen Larsen
 Jørn Larsen
 Knud Larsen
 Edvard Lembcke
 Frederik L. Levy
 Martin Lindblom
 Leo Lipschitz
 Carl Lundbye
 Bianco Luno
 Poul de Løvenørn
 Carl F. Madsen
 Finn Ejnar Madsen
 Oscar Madsen
 Johan Nicolai Madvig
 Finnur Magnússon
 Peter Malberg
 Sonja Ferlov Mancoba
 Anne Marie "madam" Mangor
 Peter Mariager
 Sophus Marstrand
 Troels Marstrand
 Wilhelm Marstrand
 Hans Lassen Martensen
 Anton Melbye
 Lauritz Melchior
 Axel Meyer
 Fritz Meyer
 Adam Ludvig Moltke
 Kate Mundt
 Adam Müller
 Jakob Peter Mynster
 Alfred Møller
 Axel Møller
 Carl Møller
 Julie Møller
 Poul Martin Møller
 Valdemar Møller
 Franz Nachtegall
 Niels Sigfred Nebelong
 Niels Neergaard
 Robert Neergaard
 Martin Andersen Nexø
 Ole Nezer
 Christian V. Nielsen (no longer exists)
 Henriette Nielsen
 Lean Nielsen
 Peter Nielsen
 Johan Nilsson
 Henrik S. Nissen
 Rasmus Nyerup
 Kim Nørrevig
 Sigvald Olsen
 Olga Ott
 Carl Otto
 Joseph Owen
 Ulrich Peter Overby
 Holger Simon Paulli
 Andreas Paulsen
 Gustav Pedersen
 Vilhelm Pedersen
 Anna Petersen
 Knud Arne Petersen
 Christian Ulrik Adolph Plesner
 Johan Martin Quist
 C.C. Rafn
 Rasmus Rask
 Lauritz Rasmussen
 E. Rasmussen Eilersen
 Louise Ravn-Hansen
 C.E. Reich
 Ebbe Kløvedal Reich
 C.A. Reitzel
 Heinrich Anna Reventlow-Criminil
 Amdi Riis
 Johan Christian Riise
 Svend Rindom
 Frederik Rohde
 Emmery Rondahl
 C.N. Rosenkilde
 J.F. Rosenstand
 Carl Eduard Rotwitt
 Natasja Saad
 Emilie Sannom
 Ragnhild Sannom
 Jens August Schade
 Virtus Schade
 Anna Margrethe Schall
 Claus Schall
 Henrik Scharling
 Hans Scherfig
 Peter Schiønning
 Gottfried Wilhelm Christian von Schmettau
 Marinus Schneider
 Peter von Scholten
 Otto Schondel
 Julius Schovelin
 Georg Ludvig von der Schulenburg
 Frans Schwartz
 Johan Adam Schwartz
 Johan Georg Schwartz
 Clara Schønfeld 
 Emmy Schønfeld
 Giuseppe Siboni
 Joakim Skovgaard
 P.C. Skovgaard
 Caspar Wilhelm Smith
 Per Sonne
 Petrine Sonne
 Andreas Schack Steenberg
 Japetus Steenstrup
 Johannes Steenstrup
 Ernst Wilhelm Stibolt
 Johanne Stockmarr
 Edvard Storm
 Michael Strunge
 Holger Strøm
 Theodor Stuckenberg
 Viggo Stuckenberg
 Christian Sørensen
 Jazz-Kay Sørensen
 Søren Sørensen
 Theodor Sørensen
 Thorvald Sørensen
 C.A.F. Thomsen
 Emma Thomsen
 Magdalene Thoresen
 Jens Jørgen Thorsen
 Johan Clemens Tode
 Vilhelm Topsøe
 Dan Turèll
 Vilhelm Tvede
 August Tørsleff
 Nils Ufer
 Georg Ulmer
 Georges Ulmer
 Moritz Unna
 Jens Vahl
 Martin Vahl (1749-1804)
 Martin Vahl (1869-1946)
 Mogens Vantore
 Frederik Vermehren
 Martha Wærn (17411812). philanthropist
 Morten Wærn
 Gregers Wad
 Eugen Warming
 Jens Warming
 Ben Webster
 Carl Weitemeyer
 Clemens Weller
 Caspar Wessel
 Edvard Westerberg
 Johannes Wiedewelt
 Christian Peder Wienberg
 Anton Wilhelm Wiehe
 Michael Wiehe
 Carl Winsløw
 William Christopher Zeise
 Otto F. Zeltner
 G.C. Zinck
 H.O.C. Zinck
 Josephine Zinck
 Ludvig Zinck
 Marie Zinck
 Otto Zinck
 Hans Christian Ørsted

See also
 Parks and open spaces in Copenhagen

References

External links

 Assistens Cemetery's website (in Danish only)
 Copenhagen's cemeteries main site (in Danish only)
 Folder about Assistens Cemetery in English (PDF format)
 Assistens Cemetery at Find A Grave
 Chapel
 CWGC: Odense (Assistens) Cemetery

1760 establishments in Denmark
Cemeteries in Copenhagen
Listed buildings and structures in Nørrebro
Lutheran cemeteries
Commonwealth War Graves Commission cemeteries in Denmark

Cemeteries established in the 18th century
 Map with some locations